Coach Trip 13 was the thirteenth series of Coach Trip in the United Kingdom. The series began airing on 30 March 2015 for 20 episodes, 3 days after the twelfth series concluded, concluding on 24 April 2015. These were the last 20 episodes of the original 80 that were commissioned in April 2014.

Voting system
The Voting system on this series was:
  The couple who got the most votes received a yellow card
  If a couple already had a yellow card and got the most votes they received a second yellow card resulting in a red card

Contestants

Voting history

Notes
 Due to Nikki's injury in the afternoon skiing session, she and Dan both had to leave for hospital before the vote. This meant that they could not cast a vote or receive any votes. The announcement that Dan and Nikki are returning was announced during the third episode on 1 April 2015.

 Julie had to go to the hospital to take a look at her swollen ankle, the doctor informed her that she had to rest it for 48 hours meaning that they had to leave the coach.

 David and Mandy had to leave the coach due to work related problems back in the UK. The couple informed Brendan and the other couples before everyone boarded outside the hotel.

 Graham and Nimm had made up their mind that because Nimm was tired during the afternoon activity the day before that she did not want to continue on the trip.

 Amy & James and Josh & Oli were both yellow carded due to keeping Brendan up during the night, this resulted in them being removed from the coach.

 Christabel and Melissa had to leave due to Christabel falling ill.

 Due to 3 of the couples leaving the coach that day, Brendan cancelled the vote.

 One of the couple received a message from home informing them that someone had fallen ill resulting in them having to leave the coach.

The Trip by Day

References

Coach Trip series
2015 British television seasons
Television series by ITV Studios
Television shows set in Austria
Television shows set in Croatia
Television shows set in Hungary
Television shows set in Italy
Television shows set in the Czech Republic